Christos Mylordos is a Greek-Cypriot singer. He was born in Nicosia on 30 April 1991.

Eurovision Song Contest 2011
On 10 September 2010, Mylordos won the singing competition of the talent show Performance and, as a result, represented Cyprus at the Eurovision Song Contest 2011 in Germany, with the Cypriot broadcaster, Cyprus Broadcasting Corporation (CyBC).

On 20 January 2011, it was announced that the song Mylordos will sing at the Eurovision Song Contest will be "San Aggelos S'agapisa" (Greek: "Σαν άγγελος σ'αγάπησα"). In the semifinal Mylordos  failed to qualify for the Eurovision final.

References

Eurovision Song Contest entrants for Cyprus
Eurovision Song Contest entrants of 2011
Living people
1991 births